Penlee Battery is a nature reserve lying on the coastal headland of Penlee Point on the Rame Peninsula, in southeast Cornwall, England.

The site was formerly the location of a gun battery, constructed between 1889 and 1892. It was originally armed with two 6-inch BL guns and a 13.5-inch BL, the latter of which was the largest gun of the Plymouth defences. During World War I and II, the battery's armament was made up of three 9.2-inch guns.

After the dissolution of coast artillery in the United Kingdom in 1956 the battery was disarmed and disposed of by the War Office. Many parts of the battery were demolished and gun positions filled in during the 1970s. One of the 6-inch emplacements remains intact, while the battery's magazines remain underground, but are filled in.

It is home to a beach revealed at low tide, and is famous among dragonfly enthusiasts as the site where Britain's first Green Darner dragonfly was found, in 1998.

References

Bibliography

External links

9.2-inch guns firing at Penlee Battery in 1935
The reserve's page at the Cornwall Wildlife Trust website

Forts in Cornwall
Military history of Cornwall
Nature reserves in Cornwall
Nature reserves of the Cornwall Wildlife Trust
Coastal artillery
Artillery batteries